Zurab Mamaladze (born 2 October 1982 in Tbilisi) is a Georgian footballer who plays for Merani Martvili.

Since Grigol Chanturia left for FC Sioni Bolnisi, Mamaladze was signed by FC Zestafoni in January 2009.

Mamaladze made his international debut on 21 February 2004, with his second cap coming on 9 September 2009.

Career statistics

National team statistics

References

External links

1982 births
Living people
Footballers from Tbilisi
Footballers from Georgia (country)
Association football goalkeepers
Expatriate footballers from Georgia (country)
Georgia (country) international footballers
FC Tbilisi players
FC Dinamo Tbilisi players
FC Spartaki Tbilisi players
FC Lokomotivi Tbilisi players
FC Borjomi players
FC Chikhura Sachkhere players
FC Sioni Bolnisi players
Gabala FC players
Expatriate footballers in Azerbaijan
FC Zugdidi players
FC Zestafoni players
FC dila gori
FC Merani Martvili players
Expatriate sportspeople from Georgia (country) in Azerbaijan